Streptomyces chattanoogensis is a bacterium species from the genus of Streptomyces which has been isolated from soil in Tennessee in the United States. Streptomyces chattanoogensis produces natamycin, pimaricin and tennecetin.

Further reading

See also 
 List of Streptomyces species

References

External links
Type strain of Streptomyces chattanoogensis at BacDive -  the Bacterial Diversity Metadatabase

chattanoogensis
Bacteria described in 1959